Siniša Belamarić (born 12 February 1947) is a Croatian water polo player. He competed at the 1972 Summer Olympics and the 1976 Summer Olympics.

References

1947 births
Living people
Croatian male water polo players
Olympic water polo players of Yugoslavia
Water polo players at the 1972 Summer Olympics
Water polo players at the 1976 Summer Olympics
Sportspeople from Šibenik